Leptodema is a small genus of African bugs in the family Reduviidae (assassin bugs). , the Integrated Taxonomic Information System lists nine species in the genus Leptodema:

Leptodema acanthocephala 
Leptodema echinata 
Leptodema elisabethae 
Leptodema farinaria 
Leptodema hirta 
Leptodema laticollis 
Leptodema petchkovskyi 
Leptodema rodriguesi 
Leptodema scotti

References

Reduviidae
Hemiptera genera